Buno Haansh (English: Wild Goose) is an Indian Bengali thriller film directed by Aniruddha Roy Chowdhury. It is based on a novel by Samaresh Majumdar of the same name, and features actors Dev, Srabanti Chatterjee and Tanusree Chakraborty in the lead roles. The music in this film was composed by Shantanu Moitra. The film released on 15 August 2014.

Plot 
The story of the film, which deals with the underworld, revolves around Amal (played by Dev), who engages himself deeply into a smuggling business. The events which occur after the boy realizes that he has become the part of a dangerous game, form the climax of the story.

Cast 
 Dev as Amal
 Srabanti Chatterjee as Sohag
 Tanusree Chakraborty as Rijula
 Moon Moon Sen as Madam
 Arindam Sil as the owner of a massage parlour
 Arindol Bagchi as Amal's brother
 Sudipta Chakraborty as Amal's sister-in-law
 Gargi Roychowdhury as Adrija/Addy
 Anindya Pulak as Robin
 Shankar Chakraborty as Badal bhai
 Subhrajit Dutta as Sohag's brother
 Alokananda Roy as Sohag's mother
 Shantilal Mukherjee as Rafik
 Sohag Sen as Amal's mother
 Pijush Bandyopadhyay as Habib bhai
 Raima Sen as Bar Dancer

Making

Production 
Arindam Sil is the executive producer for Buno Haansh. The film is  one of the high-budget films of Tollywood. The film was earlier titled Runway.

Casting 
This is the first collaboration of all the members of the cast of Buno Haansh with Aniruddha Roy Chowdhury. Initially, Koel Mallick was supposed to play the female lead, but she stepped back due to date problems. After that, various names like Radhika Apte, Raima Sen and Payel Sarkar were being considered to bag the female lead. Finally, Srabanti Chatterjee was signed to play the role.

Veteran Bengali actress Moon Moon Sen reappeared on big screen with this film after nine years, her last film being Bow Barracks Forever, which was released in 2004. She was reported to play a central character in this film. In an interview, she said, "Yes, Tony (Aniruddha Roy Chowdhury) has approached me with a role in his next film. In the past too, Tony had approached me, but somehow I couldn't work out the time. But this time I'm really looking forward to it, though I'm yet to hear the script and sign on the dotted line. At present, both of us are talking about the film." Even director Chowdhury said that signing Moon Moon was like a dream come true for him and that, there was no other actress who would fit the character perfectly.

Filming 
Director Aniruddha Roy Chowdhury was reported to search for shooting locations at Mumbai. Some scenes were also shot in Bangladesh and Thailand.

Soundtrack 

The soundtrack of the film is given by Shantanu Moitra, while the lyrics are written by Srijato, Anindya Chatterjee and Chandril Bhattacharya. The full album was released on iTunes on 27 June 2014. T-Series also uploaded a jukebox of the album on YouTube on that very same day. There are five original tracks in the album.

Track listing

References

External links 
 

Bengali-language Indian films
2010s Bengali-language films
2014 films
Films scored by Shantanu Moitra
Films set in Mumbai
Films shot in Mumbai
Reliance Entertainment films
Films directed by Aniruddha Roy Chowdhury